The Magic Box is a 2002 Tunisian drama film directed by Ridha Behi and starring Marianne Basler. It was selected as the Tunisian entry for the Best Foreign Language Film at the 75th Academy Awards, but it was not nominated.

Cast
 Marianne Basler as Lou
 Abdellatif Kechiche as Raouf as Adult
 Hichem Rostom as Mansour

See also
 List of submissions to the 75th Academy Awards for Best Foreign Language Film
 List of Tunisian submissions for the Academy Award for Best Foreign Language Film

References

External links
 

2002 films
2002 drama films
Tunisian drama films
2000s French-language films
2000s Arabic-language films
2002 multilingual films